Johan Bengtsson (born 3 May 1979 in Helsingborg, Sweden) is the bassist for The Sounds.  He has also collaborated with DJ Tommie Sunshine on the song "Dance Among the Ruins".

References

Living people
1979 births
21st-century Swedish male musicians
People from Helsingborg
Musicians from Skåne County
Swedish bass guitarists